Deborah Fisher Wharton (1795–1888) was an American Quaker minister, suffragist, social reformer and proponent of women's rights. She was one of a small group of dedicated Quakers who founded Swarthmore College along with her industrialist son, Joseph Wharton. She was a contemporary and friend of Lucretia Mott and had many of Mott's sympathies but did not actively pursue the women's rights cause, rather she was a proponent of liberal Quaker spirituality.

Early years
Deborah Fisher was born into a wealthy Philadelphia Quaker family. Her grandfather was Joshua Fisher, who was involved in early transatlantic trade and started the first packet line of ships regularly carrying goods between Philadelphia and London. Her father was Samuel R Fisher, who took on the shipping business and a large mercantile business in downtown Philadelphia.  Her mother was Hannah Rodman, of a Quaker family from Newport, RI, also associated with shipping. She was a descendant of Thomas Cornell.

Family, estate
Fisher grew up in downtown Philadelphia at 110 S Front Street. The neighborhood was busy and wealthy, and she remembered seeing famous neighbors including George Washington stroll along the street. The family enjoyed the countryside and often visited their country estate called "The Cliffs" several miles north of Philadelphia on the Schuylkill River.

Marriage
As a young woman Fisher was pious and interested in the cause of equal education and treatment of women. She married William Wharton in 1817 and together they pursued their interest in Quaker spirituality and simplicity, becoming part of the Hicksite Quaker movement. The Hicksite Friends favored simplicity and directness in their daily lives, contrasting with the more "worldly" urban (Orthodox) Quakers. In this respect the Fishers and Whartons stood out because they were wealthy and urban, but were nostalgic about living the farming life. 
Deborah's father Samuel bought a house at 336 Spruce Street in downtown Philadelphia as a wedding gift. Deborah raised her family in the house and lived there the rest of her life.

Religious and social causes
Deborah and William and were involved in Quaker Meeting affairs including many committees. Deborah was recognized by their Meeting at Ninth and Spruce Streets as a minister. She was involved in many causes, including helping the Indians of upper New York state, the anti-slavery movement, and education of children. She defended Indians' rights in Washington DC, and visited their reservations. Deborah and William successfully petitioned the city of Philadelphia to provide free education for blacks. William became one of the first directors of the Public Schools of Philadelphia and served in that capacity for twenty years.

Bellevue
William and Deborah received a gift of the Bellevue estate from his father Charles Wharton in 1834, the year that her father died. It was a farm near the Cliffs estate that she had grown up to love.  The Whartons and their children spent many happy summers at Bellevue, where they enjoyed the vegetable gardens, horse-drawn carriage trips and the cool of the nearby Schuylkill River.

Newport, Rhode Island
Wharton's mother, Hannah Rodman Fisher, came from a long line of Quaker families from Rhode Island and Massachusetts. During the Revolution years, the Narragansett Bay area became a battleground between the British and the Americans allied with the French, and the Newport economy suffered.  After the war, Hannah Rodman married Samuel R Fisher of Philadelphia and raised her family there. Although Deborah was a Philadelphian, she made the trip back to Newport many times, in later years with her children and grandchildren.

Education and Swarthmore
Like many women of her time, Deborah Fisher Wharton was kept at home by her duties as mistress of a large household and mother of ten children. But like most Quaker women of the time, she was especially interested in education. Deborah, along with her industrialist son, Joseph Wharton, together with a small group of other Hicksite Quakers from New York City, Philadelphia, and Baltimore was a founder of Swarthmore College, one of the first coeducational colleges in the country, and served on the original Board of Managers.

Deborah Fisher Wharton's family prospered. Her daughter Esther married Benjamin R. Smith, the son of educator Daniel B Smith of Philadelphia. Fisher's son, Joseph Wharton, became renowned for building a large business empire that included refining zinc, nickel, and iron.

Selected works
 (1837) An epistle from the Yearly Meeting of Women Friends, held in Philadelphia, by adjournments, from the tenth to the fifteenth of the Fourth Month, inclusive, 1837 : to the Quarterly, Monthly, and Preparative Meetings, within its limits
 (1838) An epistle from the Yearly Meeting of Women Friends, held in Philadelphia, by adjournments from the ninth to the fourteenth of the Fourth Month inclusive, 1838 : to the Quarterly, Monthly, and Preparative Meetings, within its limits
 (1840) Extracts from the minutes of the Yearly Meeting of Women Friends, held in Philadelphia, by adjournments, from the eleventh of the fifth month, to the fifteenth of the same, inclusive, 1840

References
 "The Deborah Fisher Wharton Papers, 1815–1876" Friends Historical Library of Swarthmore College.
 "Biographical Memoranda concerning Joseph Wharton, 1826–1909" by his daughter Joanna Wharton Lippincott, 1909, J. B. Lippincott & Co.
 W. Ross Yates,  "Joseph Wharton: Quaker Industrial Pioneer", 1987, Lehigh University Press
 Joseph Wharton Family Papers, 1691–1962, Library of Swarthmore College, Swarthmore PA
 Memory of DFW seeing Washington, p 214 in "Notes and Comments on Industrial, Economic, Political and Historical Subjects" by James Moore Swank, 1897, American Iron & Steel Association.
 Description of DFW's house, p 60–62 in "The Colonial Homes of Philadelphia and its Neighborhood", by Harold Donaldson Eberlein and Horace Mather Lippincott. J.B. Lippincott, Philadelphia, 1912.
 Description of DFW, p 1262 in "History of Philadelphia, 1609–1884", by John Thomas Scharf, Thompson Westcott. L.H. Everts & Co, 1884.

American suffragists
American feminists
American Quakers
University and college founders
Cornell family
Wharton family
1795 births
1888 deaths
American social reformers
19th-century American writers
19th-century American women writers
People from Philadelphia
Quaker ministers
Quaker feminists